Alexandre Arnoux (27 February 1884, Digne-les-Bains - 4 January 1973, Boulogne-Billancourt) was a French screenwriter and novelist.

Selected filmography

 Tillers of the Soil (1923)
 Misdeal (1928)
 The Faceless Voice (1933)
 On the Streets (1933)
 The Tunnel (1933)
 Ultimatum (1938)
 The Shanghai Drama (1938)
 La Loi du Nord (1939)
 The Phantom Carriage (1939)
 First on the Rope (1944)
 The Last Days of Pompeii (1950)

References

Bibliography
 Powrie, Phil & Rebillard, Éric. Pierre Batcheff and stardom in 1920s French cinema. Edinburgh University Press, 2009.

External links

1884 births
1973 deaths
20th-century French screenwriters